Luigi Torchi (7 November 1858 – 18 September 1920) was an Italian musicologist.

Torchi was born in Mordano (province of Bologna). He studied composition at the Accademia Filarmonica di Bologna, at the Music conservatories of Naples with Paolo Serrao and later in France and Germany, where he benefited from the teaching of Salomon Jadassohn and Carl Reinecke in Leipzig. At the same time he also devoted himself to the study of literature in Italy, where he returned definitively in 1884. From 1885 to 1891 he taught music history and was a librarian at the Liceo Musicale Rossini in Pesaro and in the following years he was a teacher of composition at the Liceo Musicale in Bologna. From 1894 to 1904 he was the publisher of the Rivista musicale italiana, to which he contributed with various studies and articles of criticism.

Married to Teresina Marchesini, they had two children, Steno Torchi (who died at a young age for having picked up an unexploded mine from the ground) and Atte Torchi (16 July 1907 - 25 March 2002).

He spent the last years of his life in the summer residence Villa Atte (dedicated to his daughter) located in the hills of Bazzano (Province of Bologna).

Torchi died in Bologna at age 61.

Publications 
 La scuola romantica in Germania e i suoi rapporti coll'opera nazionale e colla musica,  (1884)
 Riccardo Wagner: studio critico (1890)
 Canzoni ed arie italiane ad una voce nel secolo XVII,  (1894)
 L'accompagnamento degl'istrumenti nei melodrammi italiani della prima metà del seicento,  (1894)
 Robert Schumann e le sue "Scene tratte dal Faust di Goethe,  (1895)
 La musica istrumentale in Italia nei secoli XVI, XVII e XVIII, vol. IV  (1897), vol. V  (1898), vol. VI  (1899), vol. VII  (1900), vol. VIII  (1901)
 L'opera di Giuseppe Verdi e i suoi caratteri principali,  (1901)
 I monumenti dell'antica musica francese a Bologna,  (1906)
 L'arte musicale in Italia: pubblicazione nazionale delle più importanti opere musicali italiane dal secolo XIV al XVII, tratte da codici, antichi manoscritti ed edizioni primitive, scelte, trascritte in notazione moderna, messa in partitura ed annotate (1907)

Further reading 
 F. Vatielli: Luigi Torchi,  (1920)
 A. Toni: Luigi Torchi, in Il primato artistico italiano (1921)
 L. Ronga: Arte e gusto nella musica: dall'ars nova a Debussy (1956)
 Caterina Criscione: Luigi Torchi. Un musicologo italiano tra Otto e Novecento (unique monography about Torchi), publisher La Mandragora 1999.

References

External links 
 (en) Luigi Torchi on Open Library, Internet Archive.
 (en) Luigi Torchi on International Music Score Library Project.

Italian musicologists
1858 births
1920 deaths
19th-century musicologists